Viridicatumtoxin A (also simply called viridicatumtoxin) is a fungus-derived tetracycline-like antibiotic, whose chemical structure was determined in 1976. It is found in Penicillium viridicatum, Penicillium aethiopicum, among other fungi.

Like viridicatumtoxin B, viridicatumtoxin A inhibits growth of Staphylococcus aureus, including methicillin resistant S. aureus and quinolone-resistant S. aureus, with an activity 8 to 64 times greater than that of tetracycline.

References

Tetracycline antibiotics
Cyclohexenes
Spiro compounds